Leo Rickard Josef Johansson (born 30 June 1999) is a Swedish cross country skier who competed at the 2022 Winter Olympics. He trains out of Falun.

Cross-country skiing results
All results are sourced from the International Ski Federation (FIS).

Olympic Games

Distance reduced to 30 km due to weather conditions.

World Cup

Season standings

References

External links

Living people
1999 births
Swedish male cross-country skiers
People from Småland
Cross-country skiers at the 2022 Winter Olympics
Olympic cross-country skiers of Sweden
21st-century Swedish people